Victoria Kate Russell (born 1962) is the winner of the National Portrait Gallery's 2000 BP Portrait Award for portrait painting.

Her commissioned portraits have included the Archbishop of Canterbury, Rowan Williams, Dame Shirley Williams, and the Queen of Denmark, HM Margrethe II.

References

External links
homepage - www.victoriarussell.co.uk
National Portrait Gallery - Victoria Kate Russell

1962 births
Living people
BP Portrait Award winners
British women painters
20th-century British women artists
21st-century British women artists